Peter Atkinson may refer to:

Architects
Peter Atkinson (architect, born 1735) (1735–1805), English architect
Peter Atkinson (architect, baptised 1780) (1780–1843), English architect, son of the above

Religious figures
Peter Atkinson (priest) (born 1952), Dean of Worcester
Peter Atkinson (Archdeacon of Surrey) (1829–1888), 19th century Archdeacon of Surrey

Others
Peter Atkinson (politician) (born 1943), British politician
Peter Atkinson (cricketer) (born 1949), English cricketer
Peter Atkinson (hurler), Irish hurler